Joseph Napoléon Sébastien Sarda Garriga (1808–1877) was a French abolitionist.

References 

1808 births
1877 deaths
Governors of French Guiana
French abolitionists
Governors of Réunion